James Graham (9 April 1884 – 26 September 1952) was a British gymnast. He competed in the men's artistic individual all-around event at the 1908 Summer Olympics.

References

1884 births
1952 deaths
British male artistic gymnasts
Olympic gymnasts of Great Britain
Gymnasts at the 1908 Summer Olympics
Place of birth missing